Yan Xiaonan (born June 16, 1989) is a Chinese mixed martial artist (MMA). She currently competes in the Strawweight division of the Ultimate Fighting Championship (UFC). As of February 27, 2023, she is #6 in the UFC women's strawweight rankings.

Background
Yan's background is in Sanda. Yan attended Xi'an Sports University and was introduced to an MMA program by her coach Zhao Xuejun in 2009. At the Xi'an Sports University, Yan continued her practice in Sanda. It wasn't until 2015 that Yan switched over to MMA.

Mixed martial arts career

Early career 
Yan began training martial arts at the age of 13. She started her professional MMA career in 2009 and she has fought in various promotions, most notably Road Fighting Championship.  She amassed a record of 7-1 (NC), before signing with the UFC.

Ultimate Fighting Championship
Yan was the first Chinese female fighter signed by UFC.

Yan made her UFC debut on November 25, 2017 against Kailin Curran at UFC Fight Night: Bisping vs. Gastelum. She won the fight via unanimous decision.

Her next fight came on June 23, 2018 at UFC Fight Night: Cerrone vs. Edwards against Nadia Kassem; however she was replaced by Viviane Pereira due to injury.  She won the fight via unanimous decision.

Yan faced Syuri Kondo on November 24, 2018 at UFC Fight Night: Blaydes vs. Ngannou 2. She won the fight via unanimous decision.

Yan was expected to face Felice Herrig on June 8, 2019 at UFC 238. However, on April 30, 2019 it was reported that Herrig suffered from a torn ACL and withdrew from the event. Herrig was replaced by Angela Hill. Yan won the fight by unanimous decision.

Yan was scheduled to face Ashley Yoder on October 26, 2019 at UFC on ESPN+ 20. However, Yan pulled out of the fight in late-September citing a foot injury. She was replaced by Randa Markos.

Yan faced Karolina Kowalkiewicz on February 22, 2020 at UFC Fight Night 168. She won the fight by unanimous decision.

Yan talked of difficulty leading up to the Kowalkiewicz fight due to the outbreak of the COVID-19 pandemic in China. She and her team moved her camp to Thailand to train for the fight.

Yan was scheduled to face Cláudia Gadelha on September 27, 2020 at UFC 253, but a knee injury sustained by Gadelha ruled her out of the bout. The pair was rescheduled to UFC on ESPN: Santos vs. Teixeira on November 7, 2020 instead. As opposed to her last camp where Yan was forced to move around three times, Yan says that the pandemic situation in China is completely under control and the fight camp for Gadelha was normal. She won the fight by unanimous decision.

Yan faced Carla Esparza on May 22, 2021 at UFC Fight Night 188. For her camp with Esparza, Yan has spent her camp splitting time between the UFC Performance Institute in Shanghai and Las Vegas. She lost the bout via TKO after being dominated on the ground throughout the bout.

Yan faced Marina Rodriguez on March 5, 2022 at UFC 272. She lost the fight via split decision.

Yan faced Mackenzie Dern at UFC Fight Night 211. She won the bout via majority decision.

Yan is scheduled to face Jéssica Andrade on May 6, 2023, at UFC 288.

Mixed martial arts record

|-
|Win
|align=center|16–3 (1)
|Mackenzie Dern
|Decision (majority)
|UFC Fight Night: Dern vs. Yan
|
|align=center|5
|align=center|5:00
|Las Vegas, Nevada, United States
|
|-
|Loss
|align=center|15–3 (1)
|Marina Rodriguez
|Decision (split)
|UFC 272
|
|align=center|3
|align=center|5:00
|Las Vegas, Nevada, United States
|
|-
|Loss
|align=center|15–2 (1)
|Carla Esparza
|TKO (punches)
|UFC Fight Night: Font vs. Garbrandt 
|
|align=center|2
|align=center|2:58
|Las Vegas, Nevada, United States
|
|-
|Win
|align=center|15–1 (1)
|Cláudia Gadelha
|Decision (unanimous)
|UFC on ESPN: Santos vs. Teixeira
|
|align=center|3
|align=center|5:00
|Las Vegas, Nevada, United States
|
|-
|Win
|align=center|14–1 (1)
|Karolina Kowalkiewicz
|Decision (unanimous)
|UFC Fight Night: Felder vs. Hooker 
|
|align=center|3
|align=center|5:00
|Auckland, New Zealand
|
|-
|Win
|align=center|13–1 (1)
|Angela Hill
|Decision (unanimous)
|UFC 238 
|
|align=center|3
|align=center|5:00
|Chicago, Illinois, United States
|
|-
|Win
|align=center| 12–1 (1)
|Syuri Kondo
|Decision (unanimous)
|UFC Fight Night: Blaydes vs. Ngannou 2
|
|align=center| 3
|align=center| 5:00
|Beijing, China
|
|-
|Win
|align=center| 11–1 (1)
|Viviane Pereira
|Decision (unanimous)
|UFC Fight Night: Cerrone vs. Edwards
|
|align=center| 3
|align=center| 5:00
|Kallang, Singapore
|
|-
|Win
|align=center| 10–1 (1)
|Kailin Curran
|Decision (unanimous)
|UFC Fight Night: Bisping vs. Gastelum
|
|align=center| 3
|align=center| 5:00
|Shanghai, China
|
|-
|NC
|align=center| 9–1 (1)
|Emi Fujino
|NC (cut caused by accident headbutt)
|Road FC 34
|
|align=center| 1
|align=center| 2:48
|Shijiazhuang, China
|
|-
|Win
|align=center| 9–1
|Seo Hee Lim
|TKO (side kick and punch)
|Road FC 30
|
|align=center| 1
|align=center| 3:28
|Beijing, China
|
|-
|Win
|align=center| 8–1
|Omnia Gamal
|TKO (punches)
|IWFC Beat365: Changbai Mountain Hero List
|
|align=center| 1
|align=center| 0:23
|Jilin, China
|
|-
|Win
|align=center| 7–1
|Ye Hyun Nam
|Decision (unanimous)
|Road FC 27
|
|align=center| 2
|align=center| 5:00
|Shanghai, China
|
|-
|Win
|align=center| 6–1
|Bayarmaa Munkhgerel
|KO (punch)
|WKF: Zhong Wu Fight Night
|
|align=center| 1
|align=center| 2:34
|Beijing, China
|
|-
|Win
|align=center| 5–1
|Dolores Meek
|TKO (punches)
|URCC 26
|
|align=center| 1
|align=center| 3:25
|Pampang, Philippines
|
|-
|Win
|align=center| 4–1
|Xiaoying Wang
|TKO (punches)
|Xian Sports University: Ultimate Wrestle
|
|align=center| 2
|align=center| 0:29
|Guangzhou, China
|
|-
|Loss
|align=center| 3–1
|Karina Hallinan
|Submission (rear-naked choke)
|Martial Combat 10
|
|align=center| 1
|align=center| 3:29
|Sentosa, Singapore
|
|-
|Win
|align=center| 3–0
|Gina Iniong
|Decision (unanimous)
|Martial Combat 6
|
|align=center| 3
|align=center| 5:00
|Sentosa, Singapore
|
|-
|Win
|align=center| 2–0
|Jin Tang
|TKO (stomps and punches)
|Xian Sports University: Ultimate Wrestle
|
|align=center| 1
|align=center| 0:29
|Guangzhou, China
|
|-
|Win
|align=center| 1–0
|Unknown Fighter
|TKO (punches)
|Xian Sports University: Ultimate Wrestle
|
|align=center| 1
|align=center| N/A
|Guangzhou, China
|
|-

See also
List of current UFC fighters
List of female mixed martial artists

References

External links
 
 

Living people
1989 births
Strawweight mixed martial artists
Chinese female mixed martial artists
Chinese practitioners of Brazilian jiu-jitsu
Female Brazilian jiu-jitsu practitioners
Sportspeople from Shenyang
Chinese sanshou practitioners
Ultimate Fighting Championship female fighters
Mixed martial artists utilizing sanshou
Mixed martial artists utilizing Brazilian jiu-jitsu